Kaadedhdhoo Airport  is a domestic airport on the island of Kaadedhdhoo in Gaafu Dhaalu (South Huvadhu) atoll, Maldives. It was opened on 10 December 1993, by President Maumoon Abdul Gayoom.

Facilities

Airlines and destinations

Airlines offering scheduled passenger service:

References

External links
 
 

Airports in the Maldives
Airports established in 1993
1993 establishments in the Maldives